Tommaso Tagliaferri (born 21 September 1982) is an Italian snowboarder. He competed in the men's snowboard cross event at the 2006 Winter Olympics.

References

External links
 

1982 births
Living people
Italian male snowboarders
Olympic snowboarders of Italy
Snowboarders at the 2006 Winter Olympics
People from Giussano
Sportspeople from the Province of Monza e Brianza
21st-century Italian people